Zhang Zhenzhong (born March 1961) is a lieutenant general in the People's Liberation Army of China.

He was an alternate member of the 19th Central Committee of the Chinese Communist Party.

Biography
Zhang was born in Hancheng County, Shaanxi, in March 1961, and graduated from Northwestern Polytechnical University.

Zhang used to be chief of staff and deputy commander of Jiuquan Satellite Launch Center, commander of Xichang Satellite Launch Center, general commander of Wenchang Space Launch Site, and commander of the Rocket Army Base. In July 2016, he was commissioned as deputy commander of the People's Liberation Army Rocket Force, he remained in that position until March 2022, when he was appointed deputy chief of staff of the Joint Staff Department of the Central Military Commission.

He attained the rank of lieutenant general (zhongjiang) in July 2017.

References

1961 births
Living people
People from Hancheng
Northwestern Polytechnical University alumni
People's Liberation Army generals from Shaanxi
People's Republic of China politicians from Shaanxi
Chinese Communist Party politicians from Shaanxi
Alternate members of the 19th Central Committee of the Chinese Communist Party